Metrovalencia is an urban rail system serving a large part of the metropolitan area of Valencia. The network is a modern amalgamation of former FEVE narrow gauge electric operated suburban railways. It is a large suburban network that crosses the city of Valencia, with all trains continuing out to the suburbs. It also has destinations on lines that make it more closely resemble commuter trains. The unique system combines light railway, metro and several tram operations north of the Túria riverbed park with line 4. Trains of lines 1, 3, 5 and 9 have automatic train operation (ATO) in 25.3 kilometers of underground system. Tram lines 4, 6, 8 and 10 are operated by modern trams.

This network consists of more than 161.7 km of route, of which 29.8 km is underground.

The system authority Ferrocarrils de la Generalitat Valenciana (FGV) uses bilingual signage in Valencian and Spanish.

Operations

Lines 

Notes: In 1998, Line 2 was combined with Line 1; it became a separate branch again in 2015. Lines 7 to 9 were created in 2015 by splitting existing branch lines, with the only new stations for these lines consisting of the extension from Manises to Riba-roja de Túria.

The network includes five unmanned stations: Rocafort, Fuente del Jarro, Massarojos, Fondo de Benaguasil and Font de l'Almaguer.

Technical data 
 Gauge width:   (narrow gauge)
 Current system: 750 V DC / 1500 V DC, overhead wire

Passenger numbers 
In 2012, an estimated 63,103,814 passengers used the service, a decline of 2.8% from the 65,074,726 who had used it in 2011. The 2011 figures had shown a 5% decline compared to 2010. On average 172,887 passengers a day used the service in 2012 with the busiest day being 18 March, the final day of the Fallas festival, when 482,960 passengers used the service. The three most used stations on the network were all in the centre of Valencia: Xàtiva, beside Valencia's main train station, with 4,769,628 passengers in 2012, Colón, in one of Valencia's main shopping streets, with 4,189,736 passengers and Àngel Guimerà, an interchange station for lines 1,4 and 5 situated beside Valencia old town, with 2,461,012 users. The fourth and fifth busiest stations were Túria, next to Valencia's main bus station, with 2,035,521 and Facultats, serving the University of Valencia, with 1,951,080 users. The remaining stations in the top eight were Plaça de Espanya (1,807,538 passengers), Amistat (1,552,281) and Mislata (1,505,106). The first two of these were located in areas near Valencia centre, while Mislata was the main station for the satellite town of the same name.

In 2014, the system carried 60,111,000 passengers.

In 2015, 60,686,589 passengers used the network, reversing a decline which had occurred in previous years. Seventeen stations reported more than 1 million users in that year.

In 2019, patronage reached an all-time high of over 69 million. The ten busiest stations were Xàtiva with 5,459,784 passengers, Colón (4,520,931); Àngel Guimerà (3,067,957); Túria (2,044,393); Plaça d'Espanya (2,035,060); Facultats (1,951,546); Benimaclet (1,837,812); Amistat-Casa de Salud (1,817,120); Mislata (1,708,658); Avinguda del Cid (1,598,112).

History 
The Metrovalencia network traces its origins to the Trenet de València (ca; es) system of narrow-gauge interurban railways, of which its first section, built by the Valencian Tramway Society (:es:Sociedad Valenciana de Tranvías) was opened in 1888 between Valencia (near the Pont de Fusta, or Fusta Bridge) and Llíria. Several further extensions of the Trenet were later built between 1891 and 1912. In 1917, both the Valencian Tramway Corporation and the Compagnie Génerale des Tramways de Valence (Espagne) Société Lyonnaise (es) were merged into a single company called the Valencia Tram and Rail Company (:es:Compañía de Tranvías y Ferrocarriles de Valencia), which operated until 1964 where after years of losses, the rail operations of CTFV was acquired by FEVE.

First four lines 

On 8 October 1988 the tunnel through which line 1 crosses Valencia was opened between Sant Isidre and Ademuz (now Empalme), which connected the line with southbound trains from València-Jesús to Castelló de la Ribera (now Villanueva de Castellón) at Sant Isidre. Line 2 went from València-Sud to Llíria, with some trains terminating in Paterna.

In May 1994 the tranvia line 4 opened. Valencia was the first city in Spain to use this mode of transport in the modern era. The line connected the suburban lines with high demand zones such as the Polytechnic University, the new university campus and the Malvarosa beach, which the former line Empalme - Pont de Fusta - El Grau had connected before. One year later, in May 1995, line 3 was extended from El Palmaret in Alboraria to Alameda. The extension reused the older railway line Pont de Fusta-Rafelbunyol, of which part was scrapped (between Pont de Fusta - Sant Llorenç - El Palmaret), and the rest was switched from 750 V to 1500 V.

Further alterations followed five years later. On 16 September 1998, line 2 was merged with line 1, and Line 3 was extended from Alameda to Avinguda del Cid in the west and Torrent in the south with some trains only going as far as Jesús. Half a year later, on 20 May 1999, line 3 was extended from Avinguda del Cid to Mislata-Almassil.

Lines 5 and 6, and more extensions 

In April 2003, line 5 was opened. This line took over the previous line 3 connection from Alameda to Torrent, together with a newly constructed branch from Alameda to Ayora . (Although some very early morning trains still travel from Machado to Torrent, this is not represented on maps.) On 3 October 2005, Bailén station was opened on line 5. This station is between Colón and Jesús, and has connections with València-Nord, the main railway station of València. Furthermore, Bailen is close to the Plaça d'Espanya station on line 1. In October 2005, line 4 was extended to Mas del Rosari, and on 20 December 2005 to Lloma Llarga-Terramelar.

On 2 April 2007, Line 5 was extended to the east to a new station Marítim-Serrería (originally planned as Jerónimo Monsoriu).

On 18 April 2007, Line 5 extended to the airport (Aeroport Station) in the west and to the port (Neptú station) in the east, this last section from Marítim-Serreria to Marina Real Juan Carlos 1 is a tram section; the trains go from Aeroport to Marítim-Serrreria and then a tram operates between Marítim-Serreria and Marina Real Juan Carlos 1; the tram is now denoted as Line 8. Line 3 was extended to the Airport as well to cover the schedule limitations of line 5 to Aeroport station.

On 22 September 2007,  Line 6 was opened, linking the neighbourhoods of Orriols and Torrefiel to the metro system for the first time. Additionally a new station "Torre del Virrei" was added to Line 1. It is situated between the stations of "L'Eliana" and "La Pobla de Vallbona".

On 12 December 2010, the two overground stations on Lines 3 and 9 in the municipality of Alboraya, Alboraya and Palmaret, were replaced by the subterranean stations of Alboraya - Peris Aragó and Alboraya - Palmaret. On Line 1, the station of Jesus was renamed Joaquin Sorolla, while the Hospital station was renamed Safranar.

On 6 March 2015, a 4-station extension to Riba-roja de Túria was opened. This followed the path of a regional train line, which had been closed in 2005.

In April 2015, the metro map was redrawn, with several of the branches split into separate lines, increasing the number of lines to 9.

On 1 February 2022, the number of fare zones was reduced from four to two, as part of a reduction in ticket prices, with a fare supplement applying to Aeroport station. Twenty one stations changed their name in 2022. The purpose of the change was to make the names more readily identifiable, adapt them to the urban changes in the area covered and "linguistic normalisation" (favouring Valencian language names rather than Spanish language ones.) The changes took effect when Line 10 opened.

Accidents 

Between 2002 and the first quarter of 2012, 83 accidents had occurred on the network, costing the lives of 56 people.

On 9 September 2005, two trains crashed into each other on Line 1. Nobody was killed, but according to early reports 35 people were injured, 4 of whom were taken to hospital, their condition described as serious. The first train had been stationary waiting for a red signal. The second used its emergency brakes to avoid a collision, but was hit by a third train. The force of the impact severely damaged the drivers' cabs at the front of the last train and at the rear of the second train. The crash occurred between Paiporta and Picanya about 5 km south-east of the city centre. The 3729 and 3730 EMUs are now a single EMU with 3729A and the 3730A cars, the 'B' cars were severely damaged and are currently at València-Sud workshop, waiting to be scrapped.

The date 3 July 2006 was a dark day for the Valencia metro. In a severe accident, a two-car EMU derailed between Jesús and Plaça d'Espanya stations. At least 43 people were killed and 47 injured. It was the worst metro accident in Spanish history.

Future service 

Line 9 is planned to be extended to the centre of Riba-roja de Túria. A tunnel will be built between Bailén and Alameda stations, with a new station near Valencia city hall, in order to improve service frequency. 
Three more lines are planned.

Postponed and cancelled extensions

In 2006, the Generalitat Valenciana proposed a number of new lines and extensions which were abandoned due to lack of funds after the financial crisis of 2007–2008.

Extension from Alacant to Tavernes Blanques
Line 10 was originally planned to have run underground through Ciutat Vella (Valencia's historic centre) before emerging at surface level at Pont de Fusta station and continuing to Tavernes Blanques. One station on this line, Mercat Central, began construction in 2007 and was completed at a cost of 27 million euros, but remains a ghost station. In March 2021, the director of Valencian railways said that the project had been abandoned and that a decision would be taken on how to use the completed station.

Extension to Vilamarxant
Plans were made for an extension of Line 9 to Vilamarxant. However, by 2015, the plans had been abandoned.

Orbital line
This would have been a tram line connecting Valencia's north and south boulevards with the towns of Alboraya, Mislata and Xirivella. It would have brought metro service to Valencia's Tres Forques, L'Olivereta and Malilla districts. Only a small part of the line was constructed through Valencia's Torrefiel and Orriols districts and opened as part of the new Line 6 in September 2007.

Horta Sud light metro
This line, initially designated as line 8, would have begun at La Fe. It would have run through Valencia's district of La Torre and the towns of Sedaví, Alfafar and Benetússer before dividing into two. The southern branch would have gone through Massanassa, Catarroja, Albal, Beniparrell before terminating in Silla. The western branch was to run through Paiporta, Torrent, Alaquàs and Aldaia. It would then have split into 2 further branches. One would have terminated at Bonaire shopping centre with the other continuing through Quart de Poblet to the terminus at Faitanar.

Coastal tram
The coastal tram (es), originally designated as Line 10, would have connected Alboraya's Port Saplaya and Patacona beach with Valencia's Malvarosa and Las Arenas beaches before terminating at Marítim station.

Network map

See also 
 List of metro systems
 Medium-capacity rail transport system

Notes

References

External links 

 Metrovalencia – official site
 Ferrocarrils de la Generalitat Valenciana (FGV)
 Metrovalencia at UrbanRail.net
 Pics and information at public-transport.net

 
Rail transport in the Valencian Community
Underground rapid transit in Spain